The Woolpack Public House, Ipswich is an eighteenth century public house located where Bolton Lane forks into Westerfield Road and Tuddenham Road. It has an 18th century facade made of red bricks, but the interior is probably of an earlier date. It is Grade II listed building.

The pub started out as a country inn, located just by a toll-gate which stood at the top of Bolton Lane. Visitors to Ipswich were charged a toll for their carriages and carts. However many farmers avoided the fee by stabling their horses at the stables provided by the Woolpack, with their vehicles parked in Westerfield or Tuddenham Road.

Woolpack Identity Area
The Woolpack Identity Area was designated by Ipswich Borough Council as one of four identity areas within the Christchurch Street Conservation Area. This includes several late-Victorian terraced and semi-detached houses backing onto Christchurch Park to the west, with more such houses dating from the early twentieth century on eastern side of Westerfield Road.

Historic landlords
The names of some of the historic landlords are on record:
 1733: Francis Brett
 1813, 1823: M. Cundy
 1830, 1839: Samuel Taylor
 1979: Peter Lockwood

References

Pubs in Ipswich
Cobbold pubs
Grade II listed buildings in Ipswich
Grade II listed pubs in Suffolk